Murexsul charcoti is a species of sea snail, a marine gastropod mollusk in the family Muricidae, the murex snails or rock snails.

Description

Distribution
This marine species occurs off New Caledonia.

References

External links
 MNHN, Paris: Murexsul charcoti  (holotype)
 Houart, R. (1991). Description of thirteen new species of Muricidae (Gastropoda) from Australia and the New Caledonian region, with range extensions to South Africa. Journal of the Malacological Society of Australia. 12: 35-55

Muricidae
Gastropods described in 1991